Monroe City Regional Airport  is a public use airport located one nautical mile (1.85 km) south of the central business district of Monroe City, in Monroe County, Missouri, United States. It is owned by the City of Monroe and is also known as Capt. Ben Smith Airfield.

Facilities and aircraft 
It has one runway designated 9/27 with an asphalt surface measuring 3,515 by 50 feet (1,071 x 15 m).

For the 12-month period ending April 9, 2008, the airport had 2,060 aircraft operations, an average of 171 per month: 97% general aviation, 2% air taxi, and 1% military.
At that time there were 12 single-engine aircraft based at this airport.

References

External links 
 Aerial photo as of 3 April 1995 from USGS The National Map
 
 

Airports in Missouri
Buildings and structures in Monroe County, Missouri